Kennisis Lake/Francis Water Aerodrome  is located on Kennisis Lake,  north of West Guilford, Ontario, Canada.

References

Registered aerodromes in Ontario
Seaplane bases in Ontario
Buildings and structures in Haliburton County